Ghulam Mohammad Saroori, also known as G. M. Saroori, is an Indian politician and the former legislator of Jammu and Kashmir Legislative Assembly, who represented Inderwal constituency of Kishtwar district from 2002 to 2018 until the coalition government was ended in the state of Jammu and Kashmir.

Saroori was affiliated with Indian National Congress until August 2022 and had also served as its vice-president. In 2008, he was appointed as a Minister of State for Tourism, Forest, School Education, Social Welfare and Consumer Affairs & Public Distribution. He also served as the Minister for Mechanical Engineering and Roads & Buildings from 2009—2010.

Early life
Ghulam Mohammad Saroori was born to Saidullah Saroori, who served as the sarpanch of the Sarthal panchayat for 32 years. He worked for the Consumer Affairs and Public Distribution Department for two months before becoming a businessman alongside his father. He and his family migrated to Kishtwar in 1992—1993 due to the militancy in the region. He fathered one daughter and one son, named Huma Tabassum and Muneeb Ahmed respectively.

Political career
Saroori became associated with Nirmala Deshpande who was a social worker and Gandhian.

He first contested in the assembly elections as an independent candidate from the Inderwal Assembly constituency in 1996, losing by nearly 200 votes. He was elected as a Member of the Legislative Assembly consecutively in the 2002, 2008 and 2014 elections as a member of the Indian National Congress.

On 1 January 2008, he was appointed as the Minister of State for Tourism, Forest, School Education, Social Welfare and Consumer Affairs & Public Distribution under the state government of Ghulam Nabi Azad. He played a key role in defusing the communal tension in the Chenab Valley after the theft of an idol from the Mata Sarthal Devi Mandir by getting the culprits arrested.

Saroori was appointed as the Minister for Roads & Buildings and Mechanical Engineering under the coalition government of Jammu & Kashmir National Conference and Congress led by Omar Abdullah on 11 July 2009. He was asked by the Congress to resign from his post after a scandal involving the alleged use of an impersonator appearing on his daughter's behalf in an examination, but he ignored it and left for Jeddah to perform umrah on 25 August 2010. The state government decided to dismiss him on the following day. He was however cleared of all charges by the Central Bureau of Investigation in August 2012.

A complaint was lodged with the State Accountability Commission against Saroori in October 2012 over alleged allotments of around 2,000 tenders during his tenure as the Minister of Roads & Buildings. He was however cleared of all charges in February 2014 as they stemmed from the period of April—June 2009 when Abdullah held the portfolio.

Saroori was appointed as a vice-president for the state unit of the Congress in March 2015. He was conferred the Best Legislator Award for the year 2014—15 by Chief Minister Mehbooba Mufti in 2016. In February 2020, he was summoned by the National Investigation Agency over allegations of him being linked to a Hizbul Mujahideen commander named Jehangir Saroori. He was later exonerated by the agency.

Saroori quit the Congress along with seven other leaders on 26 August 2022 after the resignation of Azad from the party. He joined the Democratic Azad Party launched by Azad on 26 September 2022.

References 

Living people
People from Kishtwar district
Indian National Congress politicians
20th-century Indian politicians
21st-century Indian politicians
Kashmiri people
1952 births